Drymaeus multilineatus, common name the lined treesnail, is a species of medium-sized air-breathing, tropical land snail, a terrestrial pulmonate gastropod mollusk in the family Bulimulidae.

Distribution 
This species occurs in Florida, USA and Yucatan, Mexico.

References

External links 

 https://web.archive.org/web/20090802144455/http://entomology.ifas.ufl.edu/creatures/misc/gastro/tree_snail03.htm

Drymaeus
Gastropods described in 1825